The 2014 Nadeshiko League season was won by Urawa Red Diamonds Ladies, who 3 times title.

Nadeshiko League (Division 1)

First stage : Regular series

Second stage : Exciting series

Championship league

Position playoff

League awards

Best player

Top scorers

Best eleven

Best young player

Challenge League (Division 2)

Result

Best Player: Yui Narumiya, Speranza F.C. Osaka-Takatsuki
Top scorers: Kumi Yokoyama, AC Nagano Parceiro Ladies
 Best young player: Arisa Minamino, Nojima Stella Kanagawa

Promotion/relegation series

Division 1 promotion/relegation series

Iga F.C. Kunoichi stay Division 1 in 2015 Season.
Nippon Sport Science University L.S.C. stay Division 2 in 2015 Season.

Division 3 Promotion series

Block A

Yokohama F.C. Seagulls , Niigata University of Health and Welfare L.S.C. Promoted for Division 3 in 2015 Season. 
Mashiki Renaissance Kumamoto F.C. play to Division 3 promotion/relegation Series Qualifiers.

Block B

Yamato Sylphid , NGU Nagoya F.C. Ladies Promoted for Division 3 in 2015 Season. 
Diosa Izumo F.C. play to Division 3 promotion/relegation Series Qualifiers.

Block C

Norddea Hokkaido , Tsukuba F.C. Ladies Promoted for Division 3 in 2015 Season. 
Je Vrille Kagoshima play to Division 3 promotion/relegation Series Qualifiers.

Final

Diosa Izumo F.C. Stay Regional League in 2015 Season.

Division 3 promotion/relegation series

Bunnys Kyoto S.C. Stay Division 2 in 2015 Season.
Mashiki Renaissance Kumamoto F.C. Promoted to Division 2 in 2015 Season.
Shimizudaihachi Pleiades Relegated to Regional League (Tokai League) in 2015 Season.
Je Vrille Kagoshima Stay Regional League (Kyushu, Q League) in 2015 Season.

See also
Empress's Cup

References

External links
 Nadeshiko League Official Site
Season at soccerway.com

Nadeshiko League seasons
1
L
Japan
Japan